Trockenbeerenauslese (literal meaning: 'dried berry selection'), or TBA, is a German language wine term for a medium to full body dessert wine.

Trockenbeerenauslese is the highest in sugar content in the Prädikatswein category of the Austrian and German wine classifications. Trockenbeerenauslese wines, often called "TBA" for short, are made from individually selected grapes affected by noble rot (i.e., botrytized grapes).

This means that the grapes have been individually picked and are shrivelled with noble rot, often to the point of appearing like a raisin. They are therefore very sweet and have an intensely rich flavour, frequently with a lot of caramel and honey bouquet, stone fruit notes such as apricot, and distinctive aroma of the noble rot. The finest examples are made from the Riesling grape, as this retains plenty of acidity even at the extreme ripeness. Other grape varieties are also used, such as Scheurebe, Ortega, Welschriesling, Chardonnay, and Gewürztraminer and many are more prone to noble rot than Riesling since they ripen earlier.

These wines are rare and expensive due to the labor-intensive method of production, and the fact that very specific climatic conditions (which do not necessarily occur every year) are required to create botrytized grapes. Some of the best wines of this type are sold almost exclusively at the various German wine auctions. They are usually golden to deep golden in colour, sometimes even dark caramel. The body is viscous, very thick and concentrated, and arguably can be aged almost indefinitely due to the preservative powers of its high sugar content. Although TBA has very high residual sugar level, the finest specimens are far from being cloying due to a high level of acidity.

Trockenbeerenauslesen have also been in common production since the 1960s in Austria. Most TBA wines from Austria come from Neusiedlersee, Burgenland. On both sides of lake Neusiedl those wines are produced. East of the lake, the village of Illmitz is known for the production of "liquid gold". At the western side of the lake in Rust and St. Margarethen, wine of exceptionally good quality can be found. This region is known for its wide and shallow lakes which can lose more than half their volume due to evaporation. The mists created by these lakes provide a very conducive climate for noble rot to shrivel grapes.

The style is similar to, but much more concentrated than, Sélection de Grains Nobles from Alsace.

In comparison to Sauternes, the wines are considerably sweeter, have a lower alcoholic strength and are usually not oaked.

As with most other premium grade dessert wines, Trockenbeerenauslese is to a large extent sold in half bottles of 375 ml.

Requirements 
The minimum must weight requirements for Trockenbeerenauslese is as follows:
 For German wine, 150 to 154 degrees on the Oechsle scale, depending on the region (wine growing zone) and grape variety.
 In Austrian wine, 30 degrees KMW, corresponding to 154 °Oechsle.

The requirements are part of the wine law in both countries. Many producers, especially top-level producers, exceed the minimum requirements, resulting in richer and sweeter wines. In Germany it is common to add a golden capsule to indicate a superior wine. The sweetness of a TBA that just comes up to the minimum requirements may be 150 grams per liter, but in exceptional circumstances, the wines may contain more than 300 grams of sugar per liter and may approach the very rare Tokaji Eszencia in concentration.

See also
 Ausbruch 
 Beerenauslese 
 Eiswein

References

German wine
Austrian wine
Noble rot wines
Wine classification
German words and phrases